Chyasal (Nepal Bhasa:च्यास:) is an ancient town in the District of Lalitpur in Bagmati Zone in Nepal and a section of the city of Lalitpur. Also known as Yala in Nepal Bhasa. The 800 Kiratis are said to been slain in this Dabu by Lichhavis.  Yalamber was a Kirat King who settled in Nepal mainly in Ye (Kathmandu Valley) and surrounding region of Khopa (Bhaktapur) and Yala (Lalitpur).

History
This ancient town, north post of  Yala or Patan City, was a final battlefield for Kiratas and Lichhavis. About 250 A.D., Lichhavis attacked this post killing 800 Kiratas who were guarding at the post. In newari language, 800 means chyasa and the town was named chyasa. Later, it was pronounced as Chyasal. From middle age to now, “Byanjankar” also named Tepe (Newari:, Nepali:, Common: Tepe) and “Awale” also named Kumah or Kumahle in Newari means those who do manual labor, have been residing in this town and taking care of this historic places. Apart from Byanjankar and Awale people from other casts such as Shakya, Shrestha are also residing in this place.

Chyasal is famous for its preserved, traditional culture. The main occupation of the residents of this place is Agriculture and business. Nowadays, the trend is shifting and more and more people are attracted towards service based occupation.

Chyasal has been conserving its cultural heritage and rituals over thousands of years now. Many festivals, the ancient rituals and ancient heritage are also preserved and are kept safe in conservation.

Location
It is situated at north of Patan Durbar Square (Patan Palace) about distance of 500 meters and ends at Bagmati river.

Main Sights
Attraction in this town are historic stone water, sculptures of god and goddess, Ganesh temple, ponds, etc. There are only two temples with three-faced Ganesh idol (Swapakhwa Ganesh). One is in Chyasal tole and another is in Pulchowk . 

The main inhabitant of Chyasal is from Newar community with surnames Byanjankar, Awale, Shakya, Maharjan, Khadgi and Shrestha. But Byanjankar occupy a major portion of the population.

Religion
Hinduism and Buddhism.

Sports
Chyasal Youth Club aims to engage in "Sports for health and fitness for the community and national pride". The club owns its own football stadium.

Gallery

See also
 Rajkarnikar (Halwai)

References

 
 
 

Populated places in Lalitpur District, Nepal